The Outlaw Stallion is a 1954 American Western film directed by Fred F. Sears and written by David Lang. The film stars Philip Carey, Dorothy Patrick, Billy Gray, Roy Roberts, Gordon Jones, Trevor Bardette and Morris Ankrum. The film was released on July 3, 1954, by Columbia Pictures.

Plot
This western set in Utah features a wild stallion, a kid, his widowed mother, a veterinarian who'd like to marry the widow and a dyed-in-the-wool villain, posing as a surveyor but actually out to capture wild horses even though the pursuit and capture of wild horses had become an illegal practice in Utah.

Cast          
Philip Carey as Doc Woodrow 
Dorothy Patrick as Mary Saunders
Billy Gray as Danny Saunders
Roy Roberts as Hagen
Gordon Jones as Wagner
Trevor Bardette as Rigo
Morris Ankrum as Sheriff Fred Plummer

References

External links
 

1954 films
American Western (genre) films
1954 Western (genre) films
Columbia Pictures films
Films directed by Fred F. Sears
Films set in Utah
1950s English-language films
1950s American films